Thma Bang District is one of six districts (srok) and a municipality of Koh Kong Province in south-west Cambodia. Thma Bang district is bordered on the east by Sre Ambel District and Aoral District of Kompong Speu Province, on the west by Koh Kong District and Mondol Sima District, on the north by Velveng District and Krovanh District of Pursat Province and on the south by Botumsakor District. Thma Bang district has 6 communes comprising to 17 villages and occupies . About 98% of the population are farmers who depend on agriculture and forest resources hunting for living.

Notes

Districts of Koh Kong province